Hungu may refer to:

 Henguiyeh, Hormozgan, a village in Iran
 Hungu, a musical bow-type instrument of African origin, a precursor to the Brazilian berimbau
 Hungu (Korean political faction), a political faction of the Joseon Dynasty in the 15th and 16th centuries